This page shows the results of the Synchronized Swimming Competition at the 1999 Pan American Games, held from July 23 to August 8, 1999, in Winnipeg, Manitoba, Canada. There were just two medal events after the exclusion of the Women's Solo Competition.

Duet

Held on August 6, 1999

Team
Held on August 7, 1999

Medal table

References
 Sports 123
 UOL Results

1999
1999 in synchronized swimming
Events at the 1999 Pan American Games